This is a list of German football transfers in the summer transfer window 2022 by club. Only transfers of the Bundesliga, and 2. Bundesliga are included.

Bundesliga

Note: Flags indicate national team as has been defined under FIFA eligibility rules. Players may hold more than one non-FIFA nationality.

FC Bayern Munich

In:

Out:

Borussia Dortmund

In:                                       

Out:

Bayer Leverkusen

In:

Out:

RB Leipzig

In:

Out:

Union Berlin

In:

Out:

SC Freiburg

In:

Out:

1. FC Köln

In:

Out:

Mainz 05

In:

Out:

1899 Hoffenheim

In:

Out:

Borussia Mönchengladbach

In:

Out:

Eintracht Frankfurt

In:

Out:

VfL Wolfsburg

In:

Out:

VfL Bochum

In:

Out:

FC Augsburg

In:

Out:

VfB Stuttgart

In:

Out:

Hertha BSC

In:

Out:

Schalke 04

In:

Out:

Werder Bremen

In:

Out:

2. Bundesliga

Arminia Bielefeld

In:

Out:

Greuther Fürth

In:

Out:

Hamburger SV

In:

Out:

Darmstadt 98

In:

Out:

FC St. Pauli

In:

Out:

1. FC Heidenheim

In:

Out:

SC Paderborn 07

In:

Out:

1. FC Nürnberg

In:

Out:

Holstein Kiel

In:

Out:

Fortuna Düsseldorf

In:

Out:

Hannover 96

In:

Out:

Karlsruher SC

In:

Out:

Hansa Rostock

In:

Out:

SV Sandhausen

In:

Out:

Jahn Regensburg

In:

Out:

1. FC Magdeburg

In:

Out:

Eintracht Braunschweig

In:

Out:

1. FC Kaiserslautern

In:

Out:

See also

 2022–23 Bundesliga
 2022–23 2. Bundesliga

References

External links
 Official site of the DFB 
 Kicker.de 
 Official site of the Bundesliga 
 Official site of the Bundesliga

Football transfers summer 2022
Trans
2022